The Waconichi River is a tributary of the Mistassini Lake, flowing into the Regional County Municipality (MRC) of Eeyou Istchee Baie-James, in Jamésie, in the administrative region of Nord-du-Québec, in the province of Quebec, in Canada.

The course of the river flows entirely in O'Sullivan Township and in Albanel, Mistassini and Waconichi Lakes Wildlife Sanctuary.

The hydrographic slope of the river is served by route 167 which it is going north along the right shore of the Waconichi Lake and the river of the same name.

The surface of the "Waconichi River" is usually frozen from early November to mid-May, however, safe ice circulation is generally from mid-November to mid-April.

Geography

Toponymy 
Of Cree origin, this hydronym means: "the river of the mountain of the tripe of rock (polypode of Virginia)".

The name "Waconichi River" was officialized on July 10, 1969 at the Commission de toponymie du Québec.

References

See also 

Rivers of Nord-du-Québec
Eeyou Istchee James Bay